Delight may refer to:

Music
Delight (band), a Polish metal band
Delight (album) or the title song, by Rina Aiuchi, 2006
Delight (Baekhyun EP), 2020
Delight (D-Lite EP), 2014
"Delight", a song by 2 Unlimited from Get Ready!, 1992
"Delight", a song by Bic Runga from Drive, 1997

People
Delight Evans (1902–ca. 1985), American entertainment writer, editor, and film critic 
John Delight (1925–2013), British clergyman

Places
Delight, Arkansas, US
Delight Township, Custer County, Nebraska, US

Ships
English ship Delight (1583), a sailing ship that ran aground while on Sir Humphrey Gilbert's expedition to Newfoundland
HMS Delight, thirteen ships of the Royal Navy
MV Delight, a ship hijacked November 2008 by Somali pirates
Delight, a ship commanded by the British pirate Francis Spriggs 1724–1725

Other uses
 Delight, a 2013 film by Welsh director Gareth Jones
Delight Mobile, a defunct UK mobile virtual network operator service
Premier Padmini or Fiat 1100 Delight, an automobile manufactured in India 1964–2000

See also
3Delight, 3D computer graphics software
D-Lite or Daesung (born 1989), South Korean singer and actor
Deee-Lite, a 1990s American house music group
Afternoon Delight (disambiguation)
Idiot's Delight (disambiguation)
Turkish Delight (disambiguation)